Metarctia crocina is a moth of the subfamily Arctiinae. It was described by Sergius G. Kiriakoff in 1973. It is found in Zimbabwe.

References

 

Endemic fauna of Zimbabwe
Metarctia
Moths described in 1973